This article lists the main weightlifting events and their results for 2016.

2016 Summer Olympics (IWF)
 March 18 – 20: 2016 IWF Grand Prix #1 (Russian Federation President's Cup) and Olympic Qualification Event in  Kazan
 Men's 94 kg winner:  Adam Maligov
 Men's 105 kg winner:  Jaroslaw Pawel Samoraj
 Men's +105 kg winner:  Ruben Aleksanyan
 Women's 75 kg winner:  Johanie Filiatreault
 Women's +75 kg winner:  Hripsime Khurshudyan
 April 7 – 10: Aquece Rio Weightlifting 2016 (South American Weightlifting Championship) in  Rio de Janeiro (Olympic Test Event)
  won the gold medal tally. Colombia and  won 10 overall medals each.
 May 30 – June 3: 2016 IWF Grand Prix #2 (International Fajr Cup) and Olympic Qualification Event in  Tehran (debut event)
 Men's 85 kg winner:  Kianoush Rostami
 Men's 94 kg winner:  Sohrab Moradi
 Men's 105 kg winner:  Mohammad Reza Barari
 Men's +105 kg winner:  Behdad Salimikordasiabi
 August 6 – 16: 2016 Summer Olympics in  Rio de Janeiro at the Riocentro
 Men
 Men's 56 kg:   Long Qingquan (WR & OR);   Om Yun-chol;   Sinphet Kruaithong
 Men's 62 kg:   Óscar Figueroa;   Eko Yuli Irawan;   Farkhad Kharki
 Men's 69 kg:   Shi Zhiyong;   Daniyar Ismayilov;   Luis Javier Mosquera
 Note:  Izzat Artykov was disqualified from the 69 kg event, due to doping.
 Men's 77 kg:   Nijat Rahimov (WR);   Lü Xiaojun;   Mohamed Ihab
 Men's 85 kg:   Kianoush Rostami (WR);   Tian Tao;   Gabriel Sîncrăian
 Men's 94 kg:   Sohrab Moradi;   Vadzim Straltsou;   Aurimas Didžbalis
 Men's 105 kg:   Ruslan Nurudinov (OR);   Simon Martirosyan;   Aleksandr Zaychikov
 Men's +105 kg:   Lasha Talakhadze (WR & OR);   Gor Minasyan;   Irakli Turmanidze
 Women
 Women's 48 kg:   Sopita Tanasan;   Sri Wahyuni Agustiani;   Hiromi Miyake
 Women's 53 kg:   Hsu Shu-ching;   Hidilyn Diaz;   Yoon Jin-hee
 Women's 58 kg:   Sukanya Srisurat (OR);   Pimsiri Sirikaew;   Kuo Hsing-chun
 Women's 63 kg:   Deng Wei (WR & OR);   Choe Hyo-sim;   Karina Goricheva
 Women's 69 kg:   Xiang Yanmei;   Zhazira Zhapparkul;   Sara Ahmed
 Women's 75 kg:   Rim Jong-sim;   Darya Naumava;   Lydia Valentín
 Women's +75 kg:   Meng Suping;   Kim Kuk-hyang;   Sarah Robles

World weightlifting championships
 June 24 – July 2: 2016 IWF Junior World Weightlifting Championships in  Tbilisi
  won both the gold and overall medal tallies.
 October 20 – 25: 2016 IWF Youth World Weightlifting Championships in  Penang
  won both the gold and overall medal tallies.
 November 13 – 17: 2016 FISU World University Weightlifting Championships in  Mérida, Yucatán
  won the gold medal tally.  and  won 8 overall medals each.

Continental & regional weightlifting championships
 April 8 – 16: 2016 European Weightlifting Championships in  Førde
  and  won 3 gold medals each.  won the overall medal tally.
 April 22 – 30: 2016 Asian Weightlifting Championships in  Tashkent
  won both the gold and overall medal tallies.
 April 23 – 30: 2016 Pan American Junior Weightlifting Championships in  San Salvador
  won both the gold and overall medal tallies.
 May 7 – 13: 2016 African Weightlifting Championships in  Yaoundé
  and  won 4 gold medals each. Tunisia won the overall medal tally.
 May 23 – 28: 2016 Oceania Weightlifting Championships in  Suva
  and  won 3 gold medals each. Australia won the overall medal tally. 
 June 4 – 11: 2016 Pan American Weightlifting Championships in  Cartagena, Colombia
  won both the gold and overall medal tallies.
 September 10 – 17: 2016 European Youth Weightlifting Championships in  Nowy Tomyśl
 October 25 – 29: 2016 Commonwealth Weightlifting Championships in  Penang
  won the gold medal tally.  won the overall medal tally.
 November 8 – 16: 2016 Asian Youth & Junior Weightlifting Championships in  Tokyo
 Junior:  won both the gold and overall medal tallies.
 Youth:  won the gold medal tally. Iran, and  won 7 overall medals each.
 December 2 – 10: 2016 European Junior Weightlifting Championships in  Eilat
  won both the gold and overall medal tallies.
 December 8 – 15: 2016 African Junior and Youth Weightlifting Championships in  Cairo
 Junior:  won both the gold and overall medal tallies.
 Youth:  won both the gold and overall medal tallies.

2016 IPC Powerlifting World Cup
 January 21 – 23: PWC #1 in  Rio de Janeiro (Paralympic Test Event)
  won both the gold and overall medal tallies.
 February 15 – 19: PWC #2 in  Dubai
  won both the gold and overall medal tallies.
 February 24 – 28: PWC #3 (final) in  Kuala Lumpur
 For Day 1 results, click here.
 For Day 2 results, click here.
 For Day 3 results, click here.
 For Day 4 results, click here.
  won both the gold and overall medal tallies.

References

External links
 International Weightlifting Federation Website

 
Weightlifting by year
2016 in sports